Guilford Wiley Wells (February 14, 1840 – March 21, 1909) was a Reconstruction-era U.S. Representative from Mississippi.

Born in Conesus Center, New York, Wells attended the Genesee Wesleyan Seminary and College in Lima.

He enlisted in the Union Army as a private in the Twenty-seventh New York Infantry May 21, 1861.
He was promoted to second lieutenant in the One Hundred and Thirtieth New York Infantry in 1862 and subsequently to first lieutenant and captain in the Nineteenth New York Cavalry. He was mustered out on February 10, 1865, as a lieutenant colonel.

Wiles graduated from the law department of Columbian College (later George Washington University), in Washington, D.C., in 1867. He was admitted to the bar in 1867 and commenced practice in Holly Springs, Mississippi. He served as United States attorney for the northern district of Mississippi between 1870 and 1875.

Wells was elected as an Independent Republican to the Forty-fourth Congress (March 4, 1875 – March 3, 1877). He declined to be a candidate for renomination in 1876.

He served as United States Consul General in Shanghai, China, from June 23, 1877, to May 26, 1879.

He settled in Los Angeles, California, in 1879 and resumed the practice of law. He died in Santa Monica, California, March 21, 1909. He was interred in Evergreen Cemetery, Los Angeles, California.

References

1840 births
1909 deaths
Members of the United States House of Representatives from Mississippi
Union Army officers
Burials at Evergreen Cemetery, Los Angeles
Mississippi Independents
Mississippi Republicans
Independent Republican members of the United States House of Representatives
George Washington University Law School alumni
United States Attorneys for the Northern District of Mississippi
19th-century American politicians
Consuls general of the United States in Shanghai
People from Livingston County, New York
Lawyers from Los Angeles